El Mokawloon may refer to:
El-Mokawloon El-Arab (company), an Egyptian contracting firm established by the prominent civil engineer Osman Ahmed Osman 
El Mokawloon SC, an Egyptian football club owned by the contracting company